Milton, Nottinghamshire is a hamlet in Nottinghamshire. It is part of East Markham civil parish, a short distance northwest of East Markham and southwest of Sibthorpe. It is in the civil parish of West Markham.

Mausoleum

The mausoleum at Milton was designed by Robert Smirke and built in 1831–2. It was intended as a tomb for the Duchess of Newcastle who died in 1822. In 1896, Cornelius Brown wrote of the mausoleum:
Here is the vault of the noble family of Clinton; and herein the two last Dukes of Newcastle were interred. The church contains a monument to the fourth Duke, and opposite to it is a beautiful piece of statuary to the memory of his Duchess, by Westmacott. The inscription states that her Grace "gave birth to fourteen children, ten of whom lived to deplore the bereavement of an incomparable mother. Of the others, Anne Maria preceded her by a few months, and it is humbly hoped led the way to regions of eternal bliss. Two infants were carried by their parent to the grave."

Parishioners of East Markham often preferred to worship here, rather than the old church at East Markham, until it fell into disrepair.

"This church is cared for by The Churches Conservation Trust. Although no longer needed for regular worship, it remains a consecrated building, a part of England's history, maintained for the benefit of this and future generations."

(from the plaque by the door of the building)

References

External links

Bassetlaw District
Villages in Nottinghamshire
Churches preserved by the Churches Conservation Trust